Heterogeneous nuclear ribonucleoprotein H2 is a protein that in humans is encoded by the HNRNPH2 gene.

This gene belongs to the subfamily of ubiquitously expressed heterogeneous nuclear ribonucleoproteins (hnRNPs). The hnRNPs are RNA binding proteins and they complex with heterogeneous nuclear RNA (hnRNA). These proteins are associated with pre-mRNAs in the nucleus and appear to influence pre-mRNA processing and other aspects of mRNA metabolism and transport. While all of the hnRNPs are present in the nucleus some seem to shuttle between the nucleus and the cytoplasm. The hnRNP proteins have distinct nucleic acid binding properties. The protein encoded by this gene has three repeats of quasi-RRM domains that binds to RNAs. It is very similar to the family member HNRPH1. This gene is thought to be involved in Fabry disease and X-linked agammaglobulinemia phenotype. Alternative splicing results in multiple transcript variants encoding the same protein.

References

Further reading